This list covers English-language anthologies essentially confined to the Pali Canon and including material from at least two pitakas. For more specialized selections see appropriate articles. For broader selections see Buddhist texts and Pali literature.

 Some Sayings of the Buddha, ed. & tr. F. L. Woodward, Oxford World Classics, 1924
 The Life of Gotama the Buddha, ed. E. H. Brewster, Kegan Paul, Trench, Trübner & Co., London, 1926
 Buddhist Scriptures, ed. & tr. E. J. Thomas, Wisdom of the East Series, John Murray, London, 1931
 The Vedantic Buddhism of the Buddha, ed. & tr. J. G. Jennings,  Oxford University Press, London, 1947
 The Living Thoughts of Gotama the Buddha, ed. Ananda K. Coomaraswamy & I. B. Horner, Cassell, London, 1948
 The Buddha's Path to Deliverance: A Systematic Exposition in the Words of the Sutta Pitaka, ed. & tr. Nyanatiloka Thera, 1952. Available for free download here
 The Lion's Roar, ed. & tr. David Maurice, Rider, London, 1962
 The Life of the Buddha, ed. & tr. Nanamoli, Buddhist Publication Society, Kandy, Sri Lanka, 1972. Available for free download here
 The Wings to Awakening, ed. & tr. Thanissaro, 1996-2010 here
 In the Buddha's Words: An Anthology of Discourses from the Pali Canon, ed. & tr. Bhikkhu Bodhi, Wisdom Publications, 2005
 Early Buddhist Discourses, ed. & tr. John J. Holder, Hackett Publishing Company, Inc., Indianapolis, U.S.A., 2006
Buddhist meditation, An anthology of texts from the Pali canon, tr. Sarah Shaw,  Routledge, 2006
 Anguttara Nikaya Anthology: An anthology of discourses from the Anguttara Nikaya, Selected & Translated from the Pali, ed. & tr. Nyanaponika Thera & Bhikkhu Bodhi, Buddhist Publication Society, Kandy, Sri Lanka, 2007. Available for free download here
Basic Teachings of the Buddha ed. & trans. Glenn Wallis. Modern Library: New York 2007. 
 Sayings of the Buddha, ed. & tr. Rupert Gethin, Oxford University Press, New York, U.S.A., 2008
 A Taste of Salt ed. M. Breneman 2009. Available for free download here
 The Buddha's Teachings on Social and Communal Harmony: An Anthology of Discourses from the Pali Canon ed. & tr. Bhikkhu Bodhi, Wisdom Publications, 2016

Anthologies
Pāli Canon
Pali Canon anthologies
Buddhism-related lists
Translation-related lists